The Buckle Up Music Festival is a three-day country music festival in Cincinnati, Ohio, at Sawyer Point Yeatman's Cove on the banks of the Ohio River. The festival's inaugural event started from the 18th to 20th of July, 2014, and featured over 80 performances on six stages. The festival was founded by MidPoint Music Festival co-founder and former Fountain Square managing director, Bill Donabedian.

Headliners for the inaugural year included Willie Nelson, Alison Krauss & Union Station, Emmylou Harris, and Alabama.

Buckle Up coordinators also give local artists an opportunity to showcase their music and talents throughout the event. The musical festival has over 80 artists performing on six different stages, in which some of the local artists includes: Kentucky Struts, Straw Boss, Bobby Mackey, The Tillers, Kentucky Timbre, and Buffalo Wabs and the Price Hill Hustle.

Festival Dates

Buckle Up Music Festival was a summer festival that took place in the third weekend in July.
July 18–20, 2014 
August 5–6, 2016 (cancelled)

2014 line up

(Artists listed from earliest to latest set times.)

River Stage
 
Friday: Amanda Shires, The Railers, Ashley Monroe, Jamey Johnson  
Saturday: Lisa Lynn, Joe Pug, The Lone Bellow, Drive By Truckers, Old Crow Medicine Show  
Sunday: Logan Brill, Blackjack Billy, Dylan Scott, Thompson Square

Bud Light Stage
 
Friday: Joshua Scott Jones, Jamie Lynn Spears, David Fanning, Chris Janson, Marty Stuart  
Saturday: Sundy Best, Natalie Stovall and the Drive, Spirit Family Reunion, A Thousand Horses, Kristain Bush of Sugarland  
Sunday: Abigail Rose, Lyndsey Highlander, Dallas Smith, Corey Smith

Amphitheater Stage
 
Friday: The Dan Varner Band, Tyler Childers and the Foodstamps, Phillip Fox Band, Jeremy Pinnell and the 55s, Pistol Holler  
Saturday: Coraless and the Townees, Kentucky Timbre, Buffalo Wabs and the Price Hill Hustle, The 23 String Band, The Tillers 
Sunday: Kentucky Struts, Straw Boss, Bobby Mackey, Noah Smith

Main Stage
 
Friday: Old Dominion, Sturgill Simpson, Eric Paslay, Eli Young Band, Alabama
Saturday: Sleepy Man Banjo Boys, Houndmouth, Emmylou Harris, Alison Krauss and Union Station, Willie Nelson  
Sunday: Chase Bryant, JT Hodges, Sam Hunt, David Nail, The Band Perry

Acoustic Stage
 
Friday: Andrew Hibbard, Jamison Road, Messerly and Ewing, Sara Haze
Saturday:  Wild Carrot, Dean Fields, The Carolines, Caitlyn Smith 
Sunday:  Max Fender, Zach Dubois, Michaelis, Ruth Collins

Lawn Stage
 
Friday: Lonesome Jared and the Heartattacks, Alexis Gomez, Sam Lewis, Ashley Martin
Saturday:  Shiny and the Spoon, Al Scorch, Arlo McKinley and the Lonesome Sound, Tall Heights  
Sunday:  Honey and Houston, Jetset Getset, Mark Utley and Bulletville, Ty Bates

VIP Stage Tent
 
Friday: Eric Paslay, Phillip Fox Band, Old Dominion, Jamison Road, Jeremy Pinnell and the 55s 
Saturday: Arlo McKinley and the Lonesome Sound, The Tillers, Sleepy Man Banjo Boys, Buffalo Wabs and the Price Hill Hustle, Tall Heights  
Sunday: Sam Hunt, Noah Smith, Corey Smith, Bobby Mackey

See also
List of country music festivals

References

External links
 Buckle Up Music Festival Official Website

Folk festivals in the United States
Music festivals established in 2014
Festivals in Cincinnati
Music festivals in Ohio
Country music festivals in the United States
Music of Cincinnati
Defunct music festivals